The Family Bible is a gospel album by American country singer Ernest Tubb, released in 1963 (see 1963 in music).

Track listing
"I Saw the Light" (Hank Williams)
"Great Speckled Bird" (Roy Carter, Guy Smith)
"Precious Memories" (J. B. F. Wright)
"When It's Prayer Meeting Time in the Hollow" (Al Rice, Fleming Allan)
"Family Bible" (Willie Nelson)
"He'll Understand and Say Well Done" (Jesse R. Baxter, Lucie E. Campbell, Roger Wilson)
"Wings of a Dove" (Bob Ferguson)
"Follow Me" (Sandra Adlon, Virginia Balmer, Leon Rhodes)
"What a Friend We Have in Jesus" (Joseph M. Scriven, Charles Converse, Sid Feller)
"Lonesome Valley" (A. P. Carter) 
"Stand By Me" (Charles A. Tindley)
"If We Never Meet Again" (Albert E. Brumley)

Personnel
Ernest Tubb – vocals, guitar
Cal Smith – guitar
Leon Rhodes – guitar
Grady Martin – guitar
Buddy Charleton – pedal steel guitar
Jack Drake – bass
Jack Greene – drums
Hargus "Pig" Robbins – piano
Floyd Cramer – piano
The Jordanaires – vocals

References

Ernest Tubb albums
1963 albums
Albums produced by Owen Bradley
Decca Records albums
Gospel albums by American artists